Julian Lane Latimer was a rear admiral in the United States Navy. He served in World War I as a station commandant, and after WWI, as Judge Advocate General of the Navy.

Naval career 

Julian Lane Latimer was born in 1868 in Shepherdstown, West Virginia.
He graduated from the United States Naval Academy in 1890.

He was stationed on board the  during the Spanish-American War.

He earned a Navy Cross for his service on the USS Rhode Island.
On February 25, 1919, he took over the position of Commandant of the Pelham Bay Naval Training Station from Commander William B. Franklin.

Latimer became the Judge Advocate General of the Navy in the Spring of 1921 and remained so until 1925.

On May 7, 1926, Latimer became the Commander of the Special Service Squadron. On December 23, 1926, the squadron was sent to Nicaragua to deal with the Nicaraguan Civil War (1926–27). He earned the Distinguished Service Medal for his command of the squadron.

He succeeded Rear Admiral Thomas P. Magruder as the commandant of the 4th Naval District from November 5, 1927, until June 30, 1930.

References 

Judge Advocates General of the United States Navy
United States Navy rear admirals
1868 births
1930 deaths
People from Shepherdstown, West Virginia
Recipients of the Navy Cross (United States)
United States Navy personnel of the Spanish–American War
United States Navy personnel of World War I
United States Naval Academy alumni
Recipients of the Navy Distinguished Service Medal